Hawke Island is a small island off of the coast of Labrador. There is a harbour on the east side of the island named Hawke Harbour, or sometimes Hawke Bay. The Newfoundland Whaling Company operated a whaling station in Hawke Harbour in the late 1930s. Other inlets include Eagle Cove and Caplin Bay.

References

Islands of Newfoundland and Labrador